Sarangapanipettai is a village in the Kumbakonam taluk of Thanjavur district, Tamil Nadu, India.

Demographics 

As per the 2001 census, Sarangapanipettai had a total population of 428 with 233 males and 195 females. The literacy rate was 79.47%

References 

 

Villages in Thanjavur district